Lorna Maitland, born Barbara Ann Popejoy (November 19, 1943), is an American film actress. She appeared in three Russ Meyer films: Lorna, Mudhoney, and Mondo Topless.

Biography 
Lorna Maitland was born in Glendale, Los Angeles County, California, on November 19, 1943.

Filmography
Lorna by Russ Meyer (1964)
Mudhoney by Russ Meyer (1965)
Mondo Topless by Russ Meyer (1966)
Hot Thrills and Warm Chills by Dale Berry (1967)
Hip Hot and 21 by Dale Berry (1967)

Bibliography 
 
 Oakland Tribune, Doc Scortt...Actor-Printer, Sunday, March 1, 1964, Page 7-EL.
 Van Nuys Valley News, Valley West, September 11, 1964, Page 14.

References

External links 

 

American film actresses
American female adult models
American female dancers
American dancers
1943 births
Living people
21st-century American women